Hoops & Yoyo Ruin Christmas is an American animated 2011 Christmas TV special that aired on CBS on November 25, 2011. The special was based on the Hallmark Cards characters Hoops & Yoyo.

Plot
Hoops, Yoyo and Piddles are having fun during the holidays. When they are decorating late at night, Santa Claus and his reindeer fly down to their house's roof, and, as Hoops, Yoyo and Piddles are hiding, delivers presents. Hoops, Yoyo and Piddles decide to climb into the bag when Santa is not looking. However, Hoops gets stuck and somehow Yoyo and Piddles grasp onto Hoops's hand.

Suddenly, they wind up inside the time-space continuum where Santa is able to deliver presents to everyone. However, the gang loses grip and they wind up in the "Past" portal, breaking the continuum, proven by a chicken turning back into an egg. They get transported to an identical universe, and wind up breaking a boy's creation for a toy contest to become a master toymaker. The part Yoyo accidentally took off is signed with the name "Kris Kringle". Hoops suddenly realizes that they are in the past, because he finds out that Kris Kringle is another name for Santa.

They crawl into Kris's house and try to convince him that they can help him fix it. Kris believes them and they help him fix his creation. They then all go to the Toy Festival. Kris then meets a little girl who never ever had a toy. When they are in line for the judges, Kris is missing. Hoops, Yoyo and Piddles suddenly notice that he is talking to the little girl. With only 1 minute left, he must decide whether he should give it to her or win the contest. He gives the toy to the girl and they go back home.

At home, the gang is surprised when the little girl redecorated Kris's house. The little girl tells him that is not all, and she transforms into a beautiful spirit who turns Kris's house into Santa's workshop. She tells him that she was supposed to look for the next Santa. Kris is considered the next Santa and his old sleigh turns into Santa's sleigh, and, since Kris's sleigh only had one reindeer, gets more reindeer that now have the ability to fly.

Yoyo and Piddles are excited because they can go home now, but Hoops tells them that they might ruin everything again since it is Kris' first night as Santa. Yoyo and Piddles agree with Hoops on that and say goodbye to Kris and the spirit and they go inside. Before they can, the real Santa Claus flies down and greets them. When they get inside they find presents under their tree. They have also received an identical version of Kris's toy, but with the gang on it instead.

Voices
 Mike Adair - Hoops
 Bob Holt - Yoyo
 Bev Carlson - Piddles
 Michael Monken - Kris Kringle / Young Santa Claus
 Dave Parke - Santa Claus
 Brooke Lloyd - The Little Girl
 Pamela Morency - The Spirit
 Circus-Szalewski - Snooty Clerk & Mean Toymaker

Production
The special had music composed by Alan Williams as well as music performed by Parry Gripp. The special was directed by Tony Craig and aired on the CBS network on November 25, 2011 before another special, The Elf on the Shelf: An Elf's Story, based on the book The Elf on the Shelf, premiered.

References

External links
 
 

2010s animated television specials
2010s American television specials
2010s American animated films
Christmas television specials
CBS television specials
2011 television specials
2011 in American television
Santa Claus in television
2010s Christmas films
2011 television films
2011 animated films
Parallel universes in fiction
Time travel in television
Hallmark Cards
Films directed by Tony Craig (director)